Rashtriya Raksha University (RRU), formerly Raksha Shakti University (RSU), is a central university and an Institute of National Importance located in Gandhinagar, Gujarat, India. It has a specialization in national and internal security. It is not to be confused with the Indian Defence University (IDU) which is focused on the Indian military, whereas RRU is focused on the police and para-military Central Armed Police Forces (CAPF).

It was established by the Government of Gujarat, India, in 2009. In 2020, via an act of Parliament of India, the Government of India took over the university from the Government of Gujarat.

The university offers under-graduate, post-graduate, research degree programmes, and professional diploma and certificate programmes. The institute was inaugurated by the former chief minister of Gujarat Narendra Modi on 22 July 2010.

The university has been upgraded as Rashtriya Raksha University, a national university, as an Institute of National Importance through the Rashtriya Raksha University Act, passed by Parliament in October 2020.

History

Raksha Shakti University (RSU) was established in 2009 by the Government of Gujarat when Prime Minister Shri Narendra Modi was the chief minister of Gujarat. The university was set up to provide youth with better academic qualifications in the fields of counter-terrorism, counter-insurgency, internal security, police science, forensic science and cyber security. It lays great emphasis on professional security, strategy and defence education.

Campuses
On 12 March 2022, the university after being dedicated to the nation was given the mandate to establish its campuses all across the country to produce trained manpower for the security organizations of India, by the Prime Minister of India, Shri Narendra Modi, and the Minister of Home Affairs and Cooperation Minister, Shri Amit Shah. RRU at present has two campuses, with the first campus in Gandhinagar, Gujarat, and the second, in Pasighat, Arunachal Pradesh. The third campus of the university is set to be inaugurated in Uttar Pradesh. Karnataka is permitted to establish a new campus in 2023.

Rashtriya Raksha University, Gandhinagar Campus
The main campus of RRU is located northeast of Ahmedabad, in a village named Lavad, near Dahegam in Gandhinagar district. The site is abutted by a 1.5 km stretch of Meshwo River across 230 acres on the southern boundary. The university follows a distinct TREE model (Training, Research, Education, Extension), and has 10 schools imparting training and education at UG, PG, and PhD levels. The university has received a 5-star GRIHA rating for Green Campus and acquired Green Campus Award in 2018. The nearest railway station is Kalupur Railway Station and the nearest Airport is Sardar Vallabhbhai Patel International Airport and Dahegam is the nearest bus stand. The campus also has three dedicated helipads for VIP landings.

Rashtriya Raksha University, Arunachal Pradesh Campus
The university has opened its first campus outside Gujarat in Arunachal Pradesh, the campus has been established pursuant to a memorandum of understanding entered between the Government of Arunachal Pradesh and Rashtriya Raksha University. The new campus was inaugurated by the Union Home Affairs and Cooperation Minister Shri Amit Shah in the presence of Hon'ble Chief Minister of Arunachal Pradesh Shri Pema Khandu on 22 May 2022. The campus is located at Pasighat in the East Siang district of Arunachal Pradesh.

Rashtriya Raksha University, Uttar Pradesh Campus
RRU is in talks with the Government of Uttar Pradesh to open its third campus in the state.

Schools of Rashtriya Raksha University
 School of Internal Security and Police Administration (SISPA)
 School of IT, Artificial Intelligence, Cyber Security (SITAICS)
 School of Integrated Coastal and Maritime Security Studies (SICMSS)
 School of Internal Security, Defence and Strategic Studies (SISDSS)
 School of Forensics, Risk Management and National Security (SFRMNS)
 School of International Cooperation, Security and Strategic Languages (SICSSL)
 School of Criminology and Behavioural Sciences (SCBS)
 School of Security, Law Enforcement and Criminal Justice (SSLECJ)
 School of Applied Sciences, Engineering, and Technology (SASET)
 School of Physical Education and Sports (SPES)

Security and Scientific Technical Research Association (SASTRA)
The Security and Scientific Technical Research Association (SASTRA) is India's first national security innovation center. Our primary objective is to facilitate a three-way engagement between academia, industry, and the government for innovation, incubation, and technology acceleration in the security space. Effectively, we are an aggregator of solution providers who work within the problem space with an emphasis on youth engagement and "Atmanirbhar Bharat".

Research and publication centres

Research is an integral part of the activities of RRU. The university conducts researches within its academic programmes under all the schools to study & explore semi-structured & unstructured problems.

One of the major researches carried out is by Dr. Sumit Kumar Choudhary, from the Department of Forensic Science. It has busted a myth around 'Corrugated Lines as Evidence of Forgery' on which many forensic handwriting experts have relied upon until date.

RRU regularly organizes Seminars, Conferences, TOTs, Workshops, Awareness Programs and Value-Added Courses among others. It always keeps a leading position in organizing seminars like National level Research Methodology workshop sponsored by ICSSR, International Conference on Police Science and national seminar on IPR and Cyber Security.

Publications by Researchers and Faculties:

• "Wonderful World of the Mounted Police in India" – A Pictorial Narration
• Criminal Justice System in India: Need for Systemic Changes
• Booklets on Police Commemoration Day
• History of Mounted Police in India

Training
RRU provides training and education to its civilian students, and personnel from various central and state police forces, agencies of the government, paramilitary forces, defense forces, and private and corporate security. The university works towards skilling aspirants for security forces, upskilling the in-service personnel, and re-skilling the ex-servicemen and women.

Major achievements

The first convocation of the university was organized on 12 March 2022, that was graced by the presence of Prime Minister Narendra Modi. Along with Honorable Prime Minister Union Home Minister Amit Shah, Governor of Gujarat and Gujarat Chief minister were also present at the event.

The union government introduced a bill to upgrade the Gujarat-based Raksha Shakti University as an institution of national importance. G Kishan Reddy, Union Minister of State for Home, introduced the Rashtriya Raksha University Bill, 2020.

Amit Shah, The Union Minister for Home Affairs while speaking at the valedictory session of 47th All India Police Science Congress in December 2019, said that the government will establish 'Raksha Shakti University' and affiliated colleges in the states where there is no police university.

Raksha Shakti University had signed an MoU with Israel based ‘HackerU’ for its course of PG Diploma in Cyber Forensics since 2017–18.

Arjun Ram Meghwal, Minister of State for Parliamentary Affairs, Water Resources, River Development and Ganga Rejuvenation awarded the Merit trophy to Raksha Shakti University  at the 14th National Youth Parliament Competition, 2017–18.

Forensic psychologist Reena Sharma while pursuing her Ph.D. from RRU opted for the positive criminology route and assessed violent behaviour of 110 prison inmates convicted under heinous offenses like murder, rape, etc. She convinced the prison authorities to set up a psychological cell in Sabarmati Jail, Ahmedabad, Gujarat.

RRU has signed an memorandum of understanding with India Navy for collaboration for innovation and research in the field of defense. RSU was praised by Defence Minister Shree Rajnath Singh on the occasion.

Placements
The Internship & Placement Division of Raksha Shakti University endeavours to facilitate and provide suitable placement in reputed multinationals, government organizations and the private sectors. All students of the university are entitled to placement assistance, need-based training and counselling for employment. The division assures support to the visiting organizations at every stage of the placement by making university infrastructure available to them.

The Internship & Placement Division acts as an interface between the recruiters and the students for primarily enabling the students to select the best available option for their career. The division liaisons with the recruiters to provide suitable jobs to the students completing their study from the university and the section continues to facilitate the students who have already graduated from the university depending upon the requirements of the recruiters and alumni. The division conducts extra classes and mock interviews to enable and prepare the students to become successful professionals.

Student life

Student accommodation

The residences for students are anticipated as not just hostels with long corridors but rather as homes, shared by 25–30 people. These courtyard homes are put together forming a hierarchy of communities. When a cluster of homes come together they start sharing sports facilities such as badminton courts and playgrounds.

Events
Malhaar is the annual cultural festival of RSU which is organized by the student community every year, involves participants in various activities such as dance, drama, skit, and singing.

Sangram is a sports fest of RRU which is organized every year. Various outdoor games such as kabaddi, kho-kho, cricket, badminton, volleyball, athletics, and indoor games like chess and table tennis provide an opportunity for sports enthusiasts so that they can show their skills and passion towards sports.

Techno-Castle an annual technical event organized by the School of Information Technology and Cyber Security, RRU. The event consists of analytical questions leading up to the final coding round.

Impact

Extension

Training
Rashtriya Raksha University is set to define a training module for commandos of Special Protection Group. The SPG protects the prime minister, former prime ministers and their family members.

See also
 Indian National Defence University
 Education in India
 Law enforcement in India

References

Universities in Gujarat
Educational institutions established in 2010
Education in Gandhinagar
2010 establishments in Gujarat
Gandhinagar